Prorophora sacculicornella is a species of snout moth. It is found in Mongolia.

References

Phycitinae
Moths described in 1970